Kissidougou Ethnology Museum is a museum in Kissidougou, Guinea. It contains a collection related to the prehistory and ethnology of Guinea, with a collection of art, masks and fetishes.

See also
List of buildings and structures in Guinea

References

Museums in Guinea
Kissidougou